Dutch art describes the history of visual arts in the Netherlands, after the United Provinces separated from Flanders. Earlier painting in the area is covered in Early Netherlandish painting and Dutch and Flemish Renaissance painting.

The history of Dutch art is dominated by the Dutch Golden Age painting, mostly of about 1620 to 1680, when a very distinct style and new types of painting were developed, though still keeping close links with Flemish Baroque painting.  There was a healthy artistic climate in Dutch cities during the seventeenth century. For example, between 1605 and 1635 over 100,000 paintings were produced in Haarlem. At that time art ownership in the city was 25%, a record high.  After the end of the Golden Age, production of paintings remained high, but ceased to influence the rest of Europe as strongly.

Many painters, sculptors and architects of the seventeenth century are called "Dutch masters", while earlier artists are generally referred to as part of the "Netherlandish" tradition.  An individual work's being labelled or catalogued as "Dutch School" without further attribution indicates that an individual artist for the work cannot be ascertained.

The Hague School of the 19th century re-interpreted the range of subjects of the Golden Age in contemporary terms, and made Dutch painting once again a European leader. In the successive movements of art since the 19th century, the Dutch contribution has been best known from the work of the individual figures of Vincent van Gogh and Piet Mondrian, though both did their best work outside the Netherlands, and took some time to be appreciated. Amsterdam Impressionism had a mainly local impact, but the De Stijl movement, of which Mondrian was a member, was influential abroad.

Golden Age

Dutch Golden Age painting was among the most acclaimed in the world at the time, during the seventeenth century. There was an enormous output of painting, so much so that prices declined seriously during the period. From the 1620s, Dutch painting broke decisively from the Baroque style typified by Rubens in neighboring Flanders into a more realistic style of depiction, very much concerned with the real world. Types of paintings included historical paintings, portraiture, landscapes and cityscapes, still lifes and genre paintings. In the last four of these categories, Dutch painters established styles upon which art in Europe depended for the next two centuries. Paintings often had a moralistic subtext. The Golden Age never really recovered from the French invasion of 1671, although there was a twilight period lasting until about 1710.

Dutch painters, especially in the northern provinces, tried to evoke emotions in the spectator by letting the person be a bystander to a scene of profound intimacy. Portrait painting thrived in the Netherlands in the seventeenth century. Many portraits were commissioned by wealthy individuals. Group portraits similarly were often ordered by prominent members of a city's civilian guard, by boards of trustees and regents, and the like. Often group portraits were paid for by each portrayed person individually. The amount paid determined each person's place in the picture, either head to toe in full regalia in the foreground or face only in the back of the group. Sometimes all group members paid an equal sum, which was likely to lead to quarrels when some members gained a more prominent place in the picture than others. Allegories, in which painted objects conveyed symbolic meaning about the subject, were often applied. Many genre paintings, which seemingly only depicted everyday life, actually illustrated Dutch proverbs and sayings, or conveyed a moralistic message, the meaning of which is not always easy to decipher nowadays. Favourite topics in Dutch landscapes were the dunes along the western sea coast, rivers with their broad adjoining meadows where cattle grazed, often a silhouette of a city in the distance.

Rembrandt had by 1631 established such a good reputation that he received several assignments for portraits from Amsterdam. In about 1640, his work became more sober, reflecting the family tragedies that he had suffered. Exuberance was replaced by more sincere emotions. Biblical scenes were now derived more often from the New Testament instead of the Old Testament. One of his most famous paintings is The Night Watch, which was completed in 1642, at the peak of Holland's golden age. The painting was commissioned to be hung in the banquet hall of the newly built Kloveniersdoelen (Musketeers' Meeting Hall) in Amsterdam.

Johannes Vermeer's works are admired for their transparent colors, careful composition, and brilliant use of light. Vermeer painted mostly domestic interior scenes, and even his two known landscapes are framed with a window. The interior scenes are usually genre pieces or portraits.

The Utrecht School refers to a group of painters active in the city of Utrecht in the Netherlands in the early part of the seventeenth century. It is part of what is called Baroque. They were all strongly influenced by the then recently deceased Caravaggio, who died in 1610. The Bamboccianti were a group of Dutch genre painters active in Rome from 1625 to 1700, during high and late Baroque. Their works were typically small parlor paintings or etchings of everyday life, including peasants in picturesque scenes.

Nineteenth century

Hague School

By the 19th century the Netherlands were far behind the up-to-date art tendencies and schools. Possibly the best known Dutch painter in the first half of the 19th century, Johan Barthold Jongkind, after getting an art education in the country, moved over to France and spend most of his life in Paris.

At the same time, Dutch art responded to the realistic tendencies which were developing in France about the same time. The Hague School were around at the start of the nineteenth century. They included Jozef Israëls. Jacob Maris showed all that is gravest or brightest in the landscape of Holland, all that is heaviest or clearest in its atmosphere. "No painter," says M. Philippe Zilcken, "has so well expressed the ethereal effects, bathed in air and light through floating silvery mist, in which painters delight, and the characteristic remote horizons blurred by haze; or again, the grey yet luminous weather of Holland."

Amsterdam Impressionism was current during the middle of the nineteenth century at about the same time as French Impressionism. The painters put their impressions onto canvas with rapid, visible strokes of the brush. They focused on depicting the everyday life of the city. Late nineteenth-century Amsterdam was a bustling centre of art and literature. Famous painters among the Amsterdam Impressionists include George Hendrik Breitner, Willem de Zwart, Isaac Israëls, Simon Duiker and Jan Toorop. George Hendrik Breitner introduced a realism to the Netherlands that created shock waves similar to that of Courbet and Manet's in France. He was the painter of city views par excellence: wooden foundation piles by the harbour, demolition work and construction sites in the old centre, horse trams on the Dam, or canals in the rain. By the turn of the century Breitner was a famous painter in the Netherlands, as demonstrated by a highly successful retrospective exhibition at Arti et Amicitiae in Amsterdam (1901). When the streets of Amsterdam are grey and rainy, people of Amsterdam whisper grimly "Echt Breitnerweer" (Typical Breitnerweather).

Vincent van Gogh

Vincent van Gogh (30 March 185329 July 1890) was a post-Impressionist painter whose work, notable for its rough beauty, emotional honesty and bold color, had a far-reaching influence on 20th-century art. After years of painful anxiety and frequent bouts of mental illness, he died aged 37 from a gunshot wound, generally accepted to be self-inflicted (although no gun was ever found). His work was then known to only a handful of people and appreciated by fewer still.

Following his first exhibitions in the late 1880s, van Gogh's fame grew steadily among colleagues, art critics, dealers and collectors. After his death, memorial exhibitions were mounted in Brussels, Paris, The Hague and Antwerp. In the early 20th century, there were retrospectives in Paris (1901 and 1905) and Amsterdam (Stedelijk Museum, 1905), and important group exhibitions in Cologne (Sonderbund westdeutscher Kunstfreunde und Künstler, 1912), New York (Armory Show, 1913) and Berlin (1914). These had a noticeable impact on later generations of artists. By the mid-20th century van Gogh was seen as one of the greatest and most recognizable painters in history. In 2007 a group of Dutch historians compiled the "Canon of the Netherlands" to be taught in schools and included van Gogh as one of the fifty topics of the canon, alongside other national icons such as Rembrandt and De Stijl.

Together with those of Pablo Picasso, Van Gogh's works are among the world's most expensive paintings ever sold, as estimated from auctions and private sales. Those sold for over $100 million (today's equivalent) include Portrait of Dr. Gachet, Portrait of Joseph Roulin and Irises. A Wheatfield with Cypresses was sold in 1993 for $57 million, a spectacularly high price at the time, while his Self-Portrait with Bandaged Ear was sold privately in the late 1990s for an estimated $80 to $90 million.

Twentieth century

Around 1905 and 1910 pointillism as practiced by Jan Sluyters, Piet Mondrian and Leo Gestel was flourishing. Between 1911 and 1914 all the latest art movements arrived in the Netherlands one after another including cubism, futurism and expressionism, with notable artists of this era including M. C. Escher. After World War I, De Stijl (the style) was led by Theo van Doesburg and Piet Mondrian and promoted a pure art, consisting only of vertical and horizontal lines, and the use of primary colours. The Design Academy was established in 1947.

Museums
Most museums with collections of older paintings have many Dutch paintings, especially from the early and Golden Age periods, often more than they can display. Outstanding collections include:

 Alte Pinakothek in Munich
 Gemäldegalerie in Berlin
 Frans Hals Museum
 Hermitage in Saint Petersburg, Russia
 Kunsthistorisches Museum in Vienna
 Louvre in Paris
 Mauritshuis in The Hague
 Metropolitan Museum of Art in New York City
 National Gallery in London
 National Gallery, Washington D.C.
 Rijksmuseum Amsterdam

References

External links